Escandia is a monotypic moth genus of the family Noctuidae. Its only species, Escandia fimbrialis, is found in Panama. Both the genus and species were first described by Harrison Gray Dyar Jr. in 1914.

Taxonomy
The Global Lepidoptera Names Index gives this name as a synonym of Lycaugesia Dognin, 1910.

References

Acontiinae
Monotypic moth genera